Mangti is a 1942 Punjabi film starring Masood Pervez as a hero with Mumtaz Shanti and others. It ran for more than one year in Lahore and became the first Golden Jubilee Punjabi film in British India.

Music 
The music is composed by Pandit Govindram. The playback singers include Zeenat Begum, Rehmat Bai and Noor Jehan. Nand Lal Noorpuri wrote the lyrics along with Nazim Panipati.

Film songs
 Aavin Chann Ve Nehar De Kandhe Utte - sung by Zeenat Begum
 Aey Dunia Taan Khush Hundi Eiy – sung by Zeenat Begum
 Mainu Suttian Neend Na Aayee - sung by Zeenat Begum
 Banke Naina Walia Nain Milanda Ja - sung by Zeenat Begum and Rehmat Bai
 Lutt Lai Mast Jawani
 Aithaun Udd Ja Bholia Panchhia – a duet by Nandlal Noorpuri and Zeenat Begum
 Supne Vich Mahi Aaya, Haule-Haule- Sung by Zeenat Begum
 Tere Dars Di Pyasi
 Din Charhia Tey Bankian Naaran - sung by Zeenat Begum and Rehmat Bai

References 

1942 films
Indian black-and-white films
Punjabi-language Indian films
Punjabi-language Pakistani films
1940s Punjabi-language films